Smithfield Township is the name of some places in the U.S. state of Pennsylvania:

 Smithfield Township, Bradford County, Pennsylvania
 Smithfield Township, Huntingdon County, Pennsylvania
 Smithfield Township, Monroe County, Pennsylvania

See also 
 Middle Smithfield Township, Monroe County, Pennsylvania
 Smithfield, Pennsylvania, a borough in Fayette County
 Smithfield Township (disambiguation)

Pennsylvania township disambiguation pages